Frank Gist Anderson (December 19, 1891 – October 11, 1985) was an American football player and coach. He served as the head football coach at Mississippi College in Jackson, Mississippi in 1909, compiling a record of 3–5–1.

References

External links
 

1891 births
1985 deaths
Mississippi College Choctaws football coaches
People from Sparta, Tennessee
Sportspeople from Tennessee